The Chinese Association of Museums (CAM) is a professional association organized by Taiwanese museums and museum professionals.

There are 134 institutional members and over 200 individual members. The president is Hsiao Tsung-huang, deputy minister of culture. The main services provided by CAM to its members consist of providing information, organizing professional activities, training and consultation for personnel, and publications concerning the museum profession.

See also
 List of museums in Taiwan

References

External links
 The Chinese Association of Museums

Organizations with year of establishment missing
Non-profit organizations based in Taiwan
Museum-related professional associations
Professional associations based in Taiwan
Chinese Association of Museums
Organizations based in Taipei